Orohadena is a genus of moths of the family Noctuidae.

Species
 Orohadena cardinalis Ronkay, Varga & Gyulai, 2002
 Orohadena clementissima (Ronkay & Varga, 1993)
 Orohadena nekrasovi Ronkay, Varga & Gyulai, 2002
 Orohadena nobilis (Ronkay & Gyulai, 1997)
 Orohadena presbytis (Hampson, 1910)
 Orohadena xanthophanes (Boursin, 1944)

References
Natural History Museum Lepidoptera genus database
Orohadena at funet

Xyleninae